The 5VK planetary probe (short for 5th-generation Venus-Comet probe) is a designation for a common design used for Soviet unmanned probes to comet 1P/Halley and Venus. It was an incremental improvement of earlier 4MV probes used for Mars and Venus missions.

Design
The craft was three-axis stabilized and powered by twin large solar panels, weighing 4,920 kg (10,850 lb). They were equipped with a dual bumper shield for dust protection from Halley's comet. Instruments included an antenna dish, cameras, spectrometer, infrared sounder, magnetometers, and plasma probes.

Variants 
 Vega 1 (5VK No.901)
 Vega 2 (5VK No.902)

See also 
 Soviet space program
 Vega program
 4MV

References

Soviet Venus missions
Soviet space probes